Enrico Perucconi (4 January 1925 – 15 July 2020) was an Italian athlete who competed mainly in the 100 metres. He was born in Morazzone, Varese, Italy.

Biography
He competed for Italy in the 1948 Summer Olympics held in London, Great Britain in the 4 x 100 metre relay where he won the bronze medal with his teammates Michele Tito, Antonio Siddi and Carlo Monti.

Olympic results

See also
 Italy national relay team

References

External links
 
 
 
 

1925 births
2020 deaths
Athletes (track and field) at the 1948 Summer Olympics
Italian male sprinters
Medalists at the 1948 Summer Olympics
Olympic athletes of Italy
Olympic bronze medalists for Italy
Olympic bronze medalists in athletics (track and field)
Sportspeople from the Province of Varese